Metro League is a high school conference on the west side of the Portland metropolitan area of Oregon, United States, that is a member of the OSAA. It is under classification 6A of the OSAA, and it contains six Beaverton high schools, and one private school that is part of the Archdiocese of Portland.

Members

 Jesuit High School is part of the Archdiocese of Portland.

History
Metro League used to have ten high schools including the ones in Hillsboro, Oregon (Century High School, Glencoe High School, Hillsboro High School, and Liberty High School). It used to be part of classification 4A until the school year 2006–2007, it was jumped up to 6A. With that, Hillsboro High School was separated from Metro League and joined the Northwest Oregon Conference, which is under classification 5A.

References

External links
 metroleague.org
 osaa.org

High school sports in Oregon
High school sports conferences and leagues in the United States